Shahbik Zehi (also Romanized as Shahbīk Zehī; also known as Bāzār-e Khodābakhsh and Shahīk Zehī) is a village in Bahu Kalat Rural District, Dashtiari District, Chabahar County, Sistan and Baluchestan Province, Iran. At the 2006 census, its population was 743, in 117 families.

References 

Populated places in Chabahar County